The 1986 Nicholls State Colonels football team represented Nicholls State University as a member of the Gulf Star Conference during the 1986 NCAA Division I-AA football season. Led by sixth-year head coach Sonny Jackson, the Colonels compiled an overall record of 10–3 with a mark of 2–2 in conference play, placing in a three-way tie for second in the Gulf State. Nicholls State advanced to the NCAA Division I-AA Football Championship playoffs, beating Appalachian State in the first round before losing to the eventual national champion, Georgia Southern in the quarterfinals. The team played home games at John L. Guidry Stadium in Thibodaux, Louisiana.

Schedule

References

Nicholls State
Nicholls Colonels football seasons
Nicholls State Colonels football